Pachygenys ("thick jaw") is a genus of scincomorphan lizard from the Lower Cretaceous of Japan. Its name is composed of the Greek words παχυς pachys ("thick") and γένυς génys ("jaw").

Description
Pachygenys has a few defining characters, of which include a distinct foreshortening of the dentary tooth row and a reduced amount of dentary teeth. P.adachii differs from P.thlastesa in a few aspects; P.adachii has a shorter tooth row than P.thlastesa, as well as anterior and middle teeth that have uncuspid crowns and posterior teeth with simple, uncuspid conical crowns.

References

Early Cretaceous reptiles of Asia
Extinct animals of Japan
Fossil taxa described in 1999
Scincomorpha
Prehistoric reptile genera
Fossils of Japan